Salgado Filho is a bairro in the District of Sede in the municipality of Santa Maria, in the Brazilian state of Rio Grande do Sul. It is located in north Santa Maria.

Villages 
The bairro contains the following villages: Salgado Filho, Vila Brasília, Vila Kennedy, Vila Norte, Vila Nossa Senhora do Trabalho, Vila Salgado Filho.

References 

Bairros of Santa Maria, Rio Grande do Sul